Leonid Ovseevich Korchmar (born November 9, 1943) is a Russian conductor. Since 1989 he has been a conductor in the Mariinsky Theatre (former Kirov Ballet and Opera) in St. Petersburg. Having studied with Ilya Musin, he now also teaches operatic and symphonic conducting in the St Petersburg Conservatory.

External links
Leonid Korchmar's biography on the site of the Mariinsky Theatre retrieved 31st Dec 2010

Russian musicians
Living people
Place of birth missing (living people)
1943 births
21st-century Russian conductors (music)
Russian male conductors (music)
21st-century Russian male musicians